Greg Morrow is a Canadian politician, who was elected to the Nova Scotia House of Assembly in the 2021 Nova Scotia general election. He represents the riding of Guysborough-Tracadie as a member of the Progressive Conservative Association of Nova Scotia.

On August 31, 2021, Morrow was made Minister of Agriculture.

Prior to his election to the legislature, Morrow was a radio journalist and news director for CIGO-FM in Port Hawkesbury.

References

Year of birth missing (living people)
Living people
Progressive Conservative Association of Nova Scotia MLAs
Members of the Executive Council of Nova Scotia
21st-century Canadian politicians
Canadian radio reporters and correspondents
People from Antigonish County, Nova Scotia